The Emley Moor transmitting station is a telecommunications and broadcasting facility on Emley Moor,  west of the village centre of Emley, in Huddersfield, West Yorkshire, England.

It is made up of a  concrete tower and apparatus that began to transmit in 1971. It is protected under UK law as a Grade II listed building. It is the tallest freestanding structure in the United Kingdom, and 25th tallest tower in the world. It was the seventh tallest freestanding structure and was fourth tallest tower in the European Union before Brexit. When built it was the sixth tallest freestanding structure in the world after the Ostankino Tower, the Empire State Building, 875 North Michigan Avenue (known as The John Hancock Center), the Berliner Fernsehturm and Tokyo Tower.

The tower's current official name, The Arqiva Tower, is shown on a sign beside the offices at the base of the tower, but it is commonly known just as "Emley Moor Mast".

In 2021, the antenna was removed due to technical errors and it was replaced by a shorter antenna of  but the structure still remains the tallest freestanding structure in the United Kingdom.

History
Emley Moor has been a transmission site since the earliest days of commercial television in the UK. The present concrete tower is the third antenna support structure to have occupied the site.  

The first permanent transmitter built there was for ITV, covering much of the north of England. It had a  lattice tower, which provided limited coverage. This original  lattice tower was erected in 1956 to provide Independent Television broadcasts to the Yorkshire area. It entered service on 3 November 1956, transmitting Granada Television programmes on weekdays, and ABC TV programmes at weekends.

Second mast and collapse
The dismantled lattice tower was rebuilt at Craigkelly transmitting station. Yorkshire Television commenced broadcasting from the Emley Moor transmitter following the reorganisation of the ITV franchises on 29 July 1968.

At the time of its construction, it was one of the tallest man-made structures in the world. It was designed by British Insulated Callender's Cables (BICC), and manufactured by EMI, and built by J. L. Eve Construction.

The cylindrical steel mast was regularly coated in ice during the winter months, and large icicles formed on the guy wires, placing them under great strain. During winter, ice falling from the guy-wires was common. For this reason, red warning lights on the tower operated when ice was a hazard, and notices were posted on the fence adjacent to Jagger Lane, below the guy wire crossings.

On 19 March 1969, a combination of strong winds and the weight of ice that had formed around the top of the mast and on the guy wires caused the structure to collapse. The duty engineer wrote the following in the station's log book, demonstrating that failure of the structure was completely unexpected:

 Day [shift]: Lee, Caffell, Vander Byl [surnames]
 Ice hazard - Packed ice beginning to fall from mast & stays. Roads close to station temporarily closed by Councils. Please notify councils when roads are safe (!)
 Pye monitor - no frame lock - V10 replaced (low ins). Monitor overheating due to fan choked up with dust- cleaned out, motor lubricated and fan blades reset.
 Evening [shift]: Glendenning, Bottom, Redgrove [surnames]
  Mast :- Fell down across Jagger Lane (corner of Common Lane) at 17:01:45. Police, I.T.A. HQ, R.O., etc., all notified.
 Mast Power Isolator :- Fuses removed & isolator locked in the "OFF" position. All isolators in basement feeding mast stump also switched off. Dehydrators & TXs switched off.
  

The collapse left sections of twisted mast strewn over the transmitter site, and across the junction of Common Lane and Jagger Lane, and the surrounding fields. Although a falling stay cable cut through the roof of a local church and across the transmitter site buildings, no one was injured. It completely disabled the BBC2 UHF transmitter and the ITV VHF transmitter, leaving several million people without service. BBC1 VHF television transmissions continued from Holme Moss. ITV signals were restored to 2.5 million viewers within four days. The BBC provided a mobile mast on an outside broadcast van to restore a restricted BBC2 colour service within two days. The ITA bought a larger temporary mast from a Swedish company. A crew of Polish riggers were hired, and a  mast was erected in under 28 days at a cost of £100,000. This mast could hold only one set of antennae, so many viewers in outlying areas still could not receive colour programmes. The taller mast was brought into service on 16 April. Some weeks later, the BBC erected a  mast, improving coverage.

The accumulation of ice was believed to have caused the collapse, but a committee of inquiry attributed it to a form of oscillation which occurred at a low but steady wind speed. Modifications, including hanging  of steel chains within each structure, were made to similar masts at Belmont and Winter Hill. None of the modified masts have collapsed.

A section of the collapsed tower was converted for use as a racing control tower at Huddersfield Sailing Club.

New tower
After the setting up of temporary masts, erection of the current concrete tower began in 1969. UHF (625-line colour) transmissions commenced on 21 January 1971, and the older VHF (405-line black and white) system became operational on 21 April 1971. Local residents did not wish to see another mast on Emley Moor, and a departure from usual designs was called for.

Structure
The structure is a tapered, reinforced concrete tower. Reaching the tower room at the top of the concrete structure at  involves a seven-minute journey by lift. The mast's foundations penetrate  into the ground, and the whole structure, including foundations, weighs . The tower was designed by Arup. The tower is not open to the public. There was an observation area off the main road that runs past it, but as of 25 February 2018, this seems to be closed.

In 2002, English Heritage granted the tower Grade II listed building protection under UK law, being the lowest and most common of three categories, for meeting its criteria of significant architectural or historic interest.

Ownership
The tower is currently owned by Arqiva, previously the Independent Broadcasting Authority Engineering section, privatised as NTL Broadcast.

Broadcast details
It is the main station for 57 relays and repeaters throughout Yorkshire and the surrounding counties. In July 2007, it was confirmed by Ofcom that Emley Moor would remain a B group transmitter after digital switchover (DSO).

The area is important for RF, radio frequency transmission, and from the foot of the structure, both Holme Moss and the Moorside Edge transmitter are visible.  They are within a ten mile (16 km) radius, and are located to the southwest and west-northwest, respectively.

Its television coverage area is one of the largest in the UK; covering most of Yorkshire including Hull, Leeds, Sheffield and York.  Some transmissions can be received in Greater Manchester across the Pennines due to the height of the antenna on the tower and the powerful signal.

Repairs and alterations
Over the years, the concrete structure has been updated to reflect the changing nature of communications and technology.  At the top and bottom of the tower, supporting structures have been attached to accommodate dishes and aerials.

The BBC reported in July 2006 that for up to two weeks, it would broadcast analogue and digital signals at a lower power than usual, or shut down between 09:00 and 15:00 BST on weekdays from late July until 4 August, to allow aircraft warning lights to be fitted and repairs carried out.  Repairs were estimated to affect around five million homes; however, a spokesperson for National Grid Wireless announced that the work had been scheduled around major events.

Digital UK reported in April 2010 that the transmitter would undergo work in preparation for the digital switchover (DSO) in 2011.  Disruption to some or all Freeview services was expected to last for around two months, during which time a reserve transmitter would continue to broadcast the five main analogue channels.  The work was then reported to be continuing into September due to "poor weather conditions and complex engineering issues".

In March 2018, a temporary  mast was erected so that work could be undertaken on the main tower's transmitting arrays without interrupting transmissions.

Channels listed by frequency

Analogue radio (FM)

Digital radio (DAB)

Digital television (DVB-T/DVB-T2)

Before switchover

Analogue television
At Emley Moor, BBC Two analogue closed on 7 September 2011, and ITV Yorkshire temporarily moved onto its frequency at the time to allow the BBC A MUX to launch in its place. The remaining four analogue services closed on 21 September 2011, when the remaining digital multiplexes were allowed to transmit with increased power.

Relays
Below is a list of transmitters that relay Emley Moor.

Digital television

Other structures of comparable height
Taller structures
Skelton is comparable to the:
 Torreta de Guardamar, guyed, in Spain at 
 The Kyiv TV Tower is the next-tallest freestanding structure in Europe at 

Smaller structures
 It is  taller than The Shard in London, which is the next-tallest free-standing structure in the United Kingdom;
 It is  taller than One Canada Square by Canary Wharf, London, Britain's second tallest building;

See also

Telecommunications in the United Kingdom
List of radio stations in the United Kingdom
List of tallest buildings and structures in Great Britain
Radio masts and towers
List of catastrophic collapses of radio masts and towers
List of towers
List of masts
List of tallest freestanding structures in the world
Listed buildings in Denby Dale

References
References

Notes

External links

The Transmission Gallery: photographs, coverage maps and information
Info and pictures of Emley Moor transmitter including historical power/frequency changes and present co-receivable transmitters
.
Diagrams - SkyscraperPage.com
BBC Bradford and West Yorkshire - Emley Moor: Inside and Out!
Emley Moor transmitter at TheBigTower.com
A Flickr page of pictures from the inside of the tower

Buildings and structures completed in 1971
Buildings and structures in Kirklees
Grade II listed buildings in West Yorkshire
Mass media in Yorkshire
Transmitter sites in England
Towers in West Yorkshire
1964 establishments in England
1969 disestablishments
1971 establishments in England
Yorkshire Television
Denby Dale